Ayo Simon Okosun (born 21 July 1993) is a Danish footballer who plays as an attacking midfielder for Vendsyssel FF.

Personal life
Okosun was born in Denmark and is of Nigerian and German descent.

References

External links

1993 births
Living people
Association football midfielders
Danish men's footballers
Danish expatriate men's footballers
Danish people of Nigerian descent
Sportspeople of Nigerian descent
Danish people of German descent
Danish Superliga players
Danish 1st Division players
Serie C players
Akademisk Boldklub players
F.C. Grosseto S.S.D. players
Vendsyssel FF players
AC Horsens players
FC Midtjylland players
Odense Boldklub players
Danish expatriate sportspeople in Italy
Expatriate footballers in Italy
People with alopecia universalis
Footballers from Copenhagen